The women's shot put event  at the 1987 European Athletics Indoor Championships was held on 22 February.

Results

References

Shot put at the European Athletics Indoor Championships
Shot
Euro